Rodolfo Machado (May 7, 1934 – June 11, 2020) was an Argentine actor.

References

1934 births
2020 deaths
20th-century Argentine male actors
21st-century Argentine male actors